Irene Lewisohn (September 5, 1886 – April 4, 1944) was the founder of the Neighborhood Playhouse and the Museum of Costume Art.

Biography
She was the daughter of Rosalie Jacobs and Leonard Lewisohn. In 1905 she and her sister, Alice Lewisohn, began classes and club work at the Henry Street Settlement House in New York. They produced performances with both dance and drama. In 1915, they opened the Neighborhood Playhouse on the corner of Grand and Pitt Streets. There they offered training in both dance and drama to children and teenagers. Irene was in charge of the dance training and production, with the assistance of Blanche Talmud. Alice Lewisohn was in charge of the dramatic arts. In 1928 they opened The Neighborhood Playhouse School of the Theatre at 16 West Forty-sixth Street. Irene Lewisohn died in 1944. Her father is of Jewish background.

Legacy
The Irene Lewisohn Costume Reference Library is at the Metropolitan Museum of Art.

References

External  links

1886 births
1944 deaths
American people of German-Jewish descent
Jewish American philanthropists
Lewisohn family
20th-century American philanthropists